Marieke Veenhoven-Mattheussens (born 8 March 1984) is a field hockey player from the Netherlands. She was part of the Dutch teams that won the silver medal at the 2010 World Cup and three medals at the Hockey Champions Trophy in 2009–2011.

Her mother, Maria Mattheussens-Fikkers, also competed internationally in field hockey.

References

1984 births
Living people
Dutch female field hockey players
Sportspeople from Leiden
20th-century Dutch women
21st-century Dutch women